The R507 road is a regional road in the east of County Limerick, Ireland which runs south-north from its junction with the N24 national road at Cluggin Cross (near the village of Oola) and its junction with the R505 regional road in the village of Doon.

See also
Roads in Ireland
National primary road
National secondary road

References
Roads Act 1993 (Classification of Regional Roads) Order 2006 – Department of Transport

Regional roads in the Republic of Ireland
Roads in County Limerick